Weichselia is an extinct genus of fern. They were abundant from the Middle Jurassic to Early Cretaceous. While generally supposed to have affinities to Matoniaceae, some research has suggested that they have closer affinites to the Marattiales, though its morphology is strongly divergent from both of these groups. They are thought to have grown similar to modern tree ferns, with an upright stem topped with a crown of fronds.

Evolutionary history 
The genus first appeared in the Middle Jurassic with remains found in North Africa and Georgia. During the Early-mid Cretaceous, the genus had a wide distribution, having been found in Europe, East Asia, the Indian subcontinent, North Africa, southern North America and northern South America. The youngest remains of the genus are known from the early Late Cretaceous (Cenomanian) of Europe and North Africa. Remains are found in both continental and marginal marine deposits.

Ecology 
Weichselia has been intepreted as being xeromorphic, and has been suggested that they grew in savannah or coastal environments. It has also been suggested that they were primary colonisers following the destruction of pre-existing vegetation.

References

Bibliography 
 

Gleicheniales
Middle Jurassic first appearances
Early Cretaceous genus extinctions
Mesozoic life of Africa
Mesozoic life of Europe
Mesozoic life of North America
Cretaceous United States
Prehistoric plants of South America
Early Cretaceous life of South America
Mesozoic Peru
Cretaceous Colombia